Jamming is the physical process by which the viscosity of some mesoscopic materials, such as granular materials, glasses, foams, polymers, emulsions, and other complex fluids, increases with increasing particle density.  The jamming transition has been proposed as a new type of phase transition, with similarities to a glass transition but very different from the formation of
crystalline solids.

While a glass transition occurs when the liquid state is cooled, the jamming transition happens when the density, or the packing fraction of the particles, is increased.  This crowding of the constituent particles prevents them from flowing under an applied stress and from exploring phase space, thus making the aggregate material behave as a solid.  The system may be able to unjam if volume fraction is decreased, or external stresses are applied such that they exceed the yield stress. This transition is interesting because it is nonlinear with respect to volume fraction.

The jamming phase diagram  relates the jamming transition to inverse density, stress
and temperature.

The density at which systems jam is determined by many factors, including the shape of their components, the deformability of the particles, frictional interparticle forces, and the degree of dispersity of the system. The overall shape of the jamming manifold may depend on the particular system. For example, a particularly interesting feature of the jamming transition is the difference between attractive and repulsive particle systems. Whether the jamming surface diverges for high enough densities or low temperatures is uncertain.

Simulations of jammed systems study particle configurations leading to jamming in both static systems and systems under shear. Under shear stress, the average cluster size may diverge after a finite amount of strain, leading to a jammed state. A particle configuration may exist in a jammed state with a stress required to “break” the force chains causing the jam.

The simplest realization of a static jammed system is a random sphere packing of frictionless soft spheres that are jammed together upon applying an external hydrostatic pressure to the packing. Right at the jamming transition, the applied pressure is zero and the shear modulus is also zero, which  coincides with the loss of rigidity and the unjamming of the system. Also, at the jamming point the system is isostatic. Above the jamming point, the applied pressure causes an increase of volume fraction  by squeezing the soft spheres closer together, and thus creates additional contacts between neighboring spheres. This leads to an increase of the average number of contacts . As shown in numerical simulations by Corey O'Hern and collaborators, the shear modulus  increases with increasing  following the law: , where  is the dimension of space. This model is relevant for compressed emulsions, where the friction between particles is negligible. 
Another example of static jammed system is a sand pile, which is jammed under the force of gravity and no energy is being dissipated. 

Systems which are consuming energy are also sometimes described as being jammed. An example is traffic jams, where due to jamming the average velocity of cars on a road may drop sharply. Here the cars on a road may be thought of like a granular material or a non-Newtonian fluid that is being pumped through a tube. There under certain conditions the effective viscosity may rapidly increase, dramatically increasing the granular material or fluids's resistance to flowing and so causing the velocity to drop or even come to a complete stop. In this analogy the cars are like the grains in a granular material and if they are dense enough (i.e., closely enough spaced along the road) then interactions between the cars (as they must avoid each other to avoid crashing) cause jamming. A simple model of this behavior is the Nagel-Schreckenberg model.

References

External links
 (YouTube link) A video of the robotic grippers based on granular jamming designed by the Creative Machines Lab at Cornell University shows the principle applied to a robotic arm.
 (YouTube link) A video of the jamming-skin robot, designed by iRobot and funded under the DARPA Chemical Robots program, shows the principle applied to robot locomotion.

Phase transitions